The Seminole-Wekiva Trail is a paved multi-use trail in Seminole County, Florida. It stretches almost 14 miles. A section of it is part of the Florida National Scenic Trail. It is built on the former Orange Belt Railway. It connects with the Cross Seminole Trail.It offers opportunity for hikers, cyclists, dog walkers, runners, hikers and inline skaters. Extensions to the trail are proposed.

Trailheads include:
San Sebastian Trailhead
Seminole County Softball Complex
Jones Trailhead - Markham Woods Road (at Long Pond) Longwood, FL 32779
Markham Trailhead

See also
Coast-to-Coast Florida Connector trail

References

External links
 Seminole-Wekiva Trail at BikeOrlando.net
Map

Rail trails in Florida
Hiking trails in Florida
Protected areas of Seminole County, Florida
Transportation in Seminole County, Florida
Bike paths in Florida
National Recreation Trails in Florida